Three on a Spree is a 1961 British comedy film directed by Sidney J. Furie and starring Jack Watling, Carole Lesley and John Slater. It is based on the 1902 novel Brewster's Millions by George Barr McCutcheon, which became the hit 1906 play written by Winchell Smith and Byron Ongley. It had been previously filmed by Edward Small in 1945.

The film was shot at Walton Studios. Its sets were designed by the art director John Blezard.

Plot
Michael Brewster stands to inherit £8,000,000, but only if he can spend the first million in 60 days.

Cast

Reception
The New York Times found the film "all unbelievable and more than a little unpleasant."

References

External links

1961 films
1961 comedy films
British black-and-white films
British comedy films
Films based on American novels
Films based on Brewster's Millions
Films directed by Sidney J. Furie
Films produced by Edward Small
United Artists films
Films about inheritances
Films set in London
Films shot in London
1960s English-language films
Films shot at Nettlefold Studios
Films scored by Ken Thorne
1960s British films